The Back River is a  waterway in coastal Maine, USA, in the combined estuary of the Sheepscot and the Kennebec rivers. The Back River runs from Wiscasset on the Sheepscot to Georgetown on the Kennebec, intersecting another channel, the Sasanoa River, at Hockomock Bay.

Maine State Route 144 bridges the northern section of the Back River from Wiscasset to Westport Island. Maine Route 127 bridges the narrow southern part at Arrowsic, from Arrowsic Island to Georgetown Island.

The site of the decommissioned Maine Yankee Nuclear Power Plant is on the northern section.

See also 
 List of rivers of Maine

References 

 
 Maine Streamflow Data from the USGS
 Maine Watershed Data From Environmental Protection Agency

Tributaries of the Kennebec River
Rivers of Lincoln County, Maine
Rivers of Sagadahoc County, Maine